The China Railways JF2 (解放2, Jiěfàng, "liberation") class steam locomotive was a class of 2-8-2 steam locomotives for goods trains operated by the China Railway. They were originally built for the South Manchuria Railway (Mantetsu) by several American and Japanese manufacturers, as well as by Mantetsu's Shahekou Works, between 1924 and 1932.

History

To fill the need for powerful locomotives to haul heavy goods trains from the Fushun Coal Mines and Dalian, Mantetsu ordered the first five Mikani class locomotives from the American Locomotive Company of Schenectady, New York in 1924. They were immediately successful, and production of copies began at Mantetsu's Shahekou Works in 1926. Although their performance was excellent, the complexity of the three-cylinder arrangement led to consideration of a superheated 2-10-2 tender locomotive design as a replacement. However, this plan was abandoned, and more Mikanis were built instead. After a number of incidents involving broken crankshafts, the Mikashi class was designed as the successor to the class in 1933.

Postwar

At the end of the Pacific War, the 41 Mikani class locomotives were divided between the Dalian (35) and the Fengtian (6) depots, and all were taken over by the Republic of China Railway. Following the establishment of the People's Republic and the subsequent creation of the current China Railway, they became class ㄇㄎ貳 (MK2) in 1951, and class 解放2 (JF2, jiěfàng, "liberation") in 1959. Numbered in the 2501–2550 range, they were assigned to the Wafangdian locomotive depot in Dalian and used primarily on heavy goods trains. JF2 2525 is preserved at the Shenyang Steam Locomotive Museum.

References

2-8-2 locomotives
ALCO locomotives
Shahekou Works locomotives
Kawasaki locomotives
Kisha Seizo locomotives
Railway locomotives introduced in 1924
Steam locomotives of China
Standard gauge locomotives of China
Rolling stock of Manchukuo
Freight locomotives